Annalaura di Luggo (born 1970) is a multimedia artist and film-maker based in Naples.

Career
In 2019 she was invited to the 58th International Art Exhibition - La Biennale di Venezia (Dominican Republic Pavilion) where she exposed her artwork Genesis. Based on her story, the docufilm "Napoli Eden" was created, with the direction of Bruno Colella. Melting aesthetics, performance, and technology, the artist creates visually striking works that incite dialogue about social issues. She has, with dexterity and empathy, tackled incarceration (“Never Give Up”), marine world (“Sea Visions / 7 Viewpoints”), human rights (“Human Rights Vision”, for Kennedy Foundation), rebirth and redemption ("Genesis" on the occasion of participation in the 58th Venice Biennale) and blindness (“Blind Vision”). To create Napoli Eden, her last project, di Luggo used recycled aluminum to construct four site-specific monumental installations open to the public that encouraged debate on sustainability in her hometown, Naples. 

Her works have been shown in galleries in Miami, New York, Paris, Istanbul, Monte Carlo, and Italy. She created installations for the public sector, for private collections and for museums including Miace Museum, Colosimo Museum, and Nisida prison museum. Her work "Genesis" was exposed at 58th Venice Biennale in the Dominican Republic pavilion.

Most of her work has focused on the human eye, using models such as Jeremy Irons, Antonio Banderas, Mira Sorvino, Eduardo Verastegui, Peppino di Capri and many others.

Blind Vision
Blind Vision arises from Annalaura di Luggo’s interest in exploring the universe of people who perceive the world with senses other than sight. The multimedia installation (permanently displayed at the Museum of the P. Colosimo Institute in Naples), focuses on the sense of sight, by exhibiting the eyes of a group of 20 totally or partially blind people. It was shown at the Basel Art Fair, in New York, Cortina d’Ampezzo, Naples, and at the United Nations. Today it is permanent at Colosimo Museum Naples. It showed the eyes of a group of 20 totally or partially blind people. It was reviewed by Paul Laster, Paco Barragan, and Timothy Hadfield.

Napoli Eden
Napoli Eden is a set of four site-specific monumental installations open to the public  held across four squares  (Piazza Municipio, Galleria Umberto I, Largo Baracche, Largo Santa Caterina), in the city of Naples, Italy. This project inspired the creation of the feature docu-film “Napoli Eden”, coming soon to the cinema, directed by Bruno Colella with music by Eugenio Bennato, cinematography by Blasco Giurato, creative consultancy by Stanley Isaacs and marketing consultancy by Greg Ferris. It was inspired by the true story of the artist when she decided to install her artworks and to involve some troubled youngs from the Spanish Quarters of Naples in the construction of Pyramid, a metallic tree of 10 meters, made by aluminum scraps to stimulate new life prospects and "a journey towards the light".

This cinematic artistic project highlights environmental protection through the theme of transforming recycled aluminum into works of art and conveys a vision of redemption, social inclusion and the ethical and cultural rebirth by leveraging the social inclusion of the "rascals" of the Spanish Quarters.

Napoli Eden premiered in Rome at the Arena Adriano studios and was qualified as “Film d’essai”. The film won various awards at international festivals, including: Impact DOCS Awards California; Hollywood Gold Awards 2020; L’Age d’Or International Arthouse Film Festival 2020; Venice Film Awards 2020 and a special mention of the critical jury at Social World Film Festival 2020.

Napoli Eden has passed the admission selection to the 93rd Academy Awards and is in consideration as best documentary feature.

Animal art 
She has also created works focusing on fish irides (i.e. irises).

Colloculi > We Are Art 
In 2022, the artist creates "Colloculi > We Are Art," curated by Gabriele Perretta, and exposed at the Banco di Napoli Foundation until September 2022.

“Colloculi” is an immersive, multi-media, interactive art installation constructed in the shape of a Giant Eye made of recycled aluminum, symbolizing environmental rebirth and recycling.

Through the pupil is projected the Multimedia installation "We Are Art". The starting point are the eyes of four young adults, who reveal through the languages of video art, sound design and immersive reality, how they overcame adversities such as bullying, racial discrimination, blindness, alcohol and crime allowing the viewer in the gallery, through virtual technology, to interact and become part of the installation.

The creative process is narrated in the documentary We Are Art Through the Eyes of Annalaura directed by the same artist.

Recent Exhibitions 

 "Genesis", La Biennale di Venezia 2019.
 "Napoli Eden", 4 monumental installations in recycled aluminium on public display in Naples.
 "Blind Vision", multimedia and documentary work on blindness, exhibited at the United Nations in New York on the occasion of the World Conference on Disability.
 "Never Give up", permanent installation in the Juvenile Prison Museum of Nisida (Naples).
 "Occh-IO/Eye/I", Art Basel Scope Miami - New York – Basel.
 "Human Rights Vision", exhibition on human rights at the Palazzo Vecchio in Florence. 
 "Sea Visions", seven installations at the Genoa International Boat Show.
 "An eye against progeria"

Filmography 

 Napoli Eden (feature documentary - 2020) by Bruno Colella.
 Blind Vision (documentary - 2017) by Nanni Zedda.
 Never Give Up (short - 2016) by Pierluigi Ferrandini.
 Giving Back generation: TV series for Tatatu.

Bibliography 

 2019 - "Genesis", 58. International Art Exhibition - La Biennale di Venezia, Dominican Republic Pavilion catalog curated by Francesco Gallo Mazzeo, JUS Museum Editions / Giannini Editor, Naples.
 2019 - “Napoli Eden”, catalog curated by Francesco Gallo Mazzeo, JUS Museum Editions / Giannini Editor, Naples.
 2017 - “Blind Vision” catalog curated by Raisa Clavijo, Artium Publishing Editions, Miami.

External links 

 Official Website
 IMDb
 Dominican Republic Pavilion Venice Biennale

References

1970 births
Living people
21st-century Italian women artists
Artists from Naples
Animal artists
Photographers from Naples
Italian contemporary artists